"Love Story (vs. Finally)" (also known as "Love Story") is a song written and released by British duo Layo & Bushwacka!. It was originally released in 2002 under the name "Love Story", charting at number 4 on the Billboard Hot Dance Club Play Chart. The remix single was released in January 2003 and peaked at number 8 in the United Kingdom, spending one week in the top 10. The song uses samples from Nina Simone's "Rags & Old Iron" and Devo's "Mongoloid". The "Finally" portion of the single is a vocal from the single "Finally" by the American house music project The Kings of Tomorrow featuring Julie McKnight, which reached number 17 on the Billboard Dance Club Songs chart in 2000. The synth hook of the song is sampled in the song "Boladona" by Tati Quebra-Barraco.

Certifications

References

2003 singles
British dance songs
XL Recordings singles
2003 songs
Mashup songs